The chestnut-breasted cuckoo (Cacomantis castaneiventris) is a species of cuckoo in the family Cuculidae.
It is found in Australia, Indonesia, and Papua New Guinea. Its natural habitats are subtropical or tropical dry forests and subtropical or tropical mangrove forests.

Taxonomy

Three subspecies are currently recognised:

 Cacomantis castaneiventris arfakianus (Salvadori, 1889) – Parts of western New Guinea.
 Cacomantis castaneiventris weiskei (Reichenow, 1900) – Eastern New Guinea.
 Cacomantis castaneiventris castaneiventris (Gould, 1867) – Aru Islands in Indonesia and the Cape York Peninsula in Australia.

Description

Adults have a dark slaty grey-blue head, back and wings, deep rufous breast and underparts and barred black and white tail. Immatures are dull greyish cinnamon on the head and wings, grading to dull mid brown on the outer parts of the wings, and pale buff or cinnamon on the breast and underparts. The tail is barred mid brown and white. Both adults and immatures have a yellow orbital eye ring.

The chestnut-breasted cuckoo is slightly smaller than the similar brush cuckoo (C. variolosus) and fan-tailed cuckoo (C. flabelliformis), but the breast and underparts of the adult chestnut-breasted cuckoo is much darker.

References

chestnut-breasted cuckoo
Birds of New Guinea
Birds of Cape York Peninsula
chestnut-breasted cuckoo
Taxonomy articles created by Polbot